Vanessa Karmine Villalobos Vázquez (born 26 October 2001) is a Mexican badminton player. She affiliate with Guadalajara, Jalisco team.

Achievements

Pan Am Championships 
Women's doubles

BWF International Challenge/Series (3 titles, 6 runners-up) 
Women's doubles

Mixed doubles

  BWF International Challenge tournament
  BWF International Series tournament
  BWF Future Series tournament

References

External links 
 

2001 births
Living people
Sportspeople from Guadalajara, Jalisco
Mexican female badminton players
21st-century Mexican women